The Pat's Little Theater is an historic structure located at 746 5th Avenue in San Diego's Gaslamp Quarter, in the U.S. state of California. It was built in 1906.

See also
 List of Gaslamp Quarter historic buildings

External links

 

1906 establishments in California
Buildings and structures in San Diego
Gaslamp Quarter, San Diego
Theatres completed in 1906